The 2021–22 season is Shrewsbury Town's 136th year in their history and seventh consecutive season in League One. Along with the league, the club will also compete in the FA Cup, the EFL Cup and the EFL Trophy. The season covers the period from 1 July 2021 to 30 June 2022.

Pre-season friendlies

Shrewsbury Town confirmed as part of their pre-season preparations they would have friendlies against AFC Telford United, Tamworth, Hereford and Exeter City.

However, the planned friendly against Tamworth was cancelled due to unforeseen circumstances.

Competitions

League One

League table

Results summary

Results by matchday

Matches
Salop's fixtures were released on 24 June 2021.

FA Cup

Shrewsbury were drawn away to Stratford Town in the first round, Carlisle United in the second round and Liverpool in the third round.

EFL Cup

Shrewsbury Town were drawn at home to Lincoln City in the first round and Rochdale in the second round.

EFL Trophy

Town were drawn into Northern Group C alongside Crewe Alexandra, Wigan Athletic and Wolverhampton Wanderers U21s. On July 6, the group stage ties were confirmed.

Transfers

Transfers in

Loans in

Loans out

Transfers out

References

Shrewsbury Town
Shrewsbury Town F.C. seasons